Founded 1992 by John Loder, Southern Records is an independent record label (Loder also ran the recording facility Southern Studios). It is based in London and until 2008 had offices in the United States, France and Berlin.

The label is closely associated with Crass Records, Corpus Christi Records and Dischord Records.

History

Background 
Southern Studios was a recording label owned and operated by John Loder from the 1970's until his death. Loder became friends with musician Penny Rimbaud and collaborated with him in an experimental band called EXIT. Rimbaud later formed anarchist punk band Crass, and Loder and his Southern Studios were chosen to record their first album The Feeding of the 5000. That record was originally released on Small Wonder Records. When Small Wonder encountered problems manufacturing the release, due to the allegedly blasphemous nature of the lyrics, Crass decided they needed their own label to take full control of their output. Loder facilitated this by acting as the business manager behind Crass Records. He arranged manufacture, distribution and accounting.

After the Crass record's success in 1978, Loder became the go-to alternative distributor for a generation of independent musicians. This connected Loder with the emerging international independent record business. He formed alliances with small distributors around the world to distribute Crass's output, and in the process U.S. labels like Touch and Go found outlets for their releases overseas. Circa 1984, he formed a lasting partnership with Dischord Records. In 1986, Ian MacKaye traveled to London looking to forge a deal with Loder that would satisfy the demand for Minor Threat records in the UK. The deal struck resulted in the manufacture of Dischord records in a factory that Southern had contracted with on the European mainland, and for decades Minor Threat records were stamped "Made in France." Southern served as their pressing agent and distributor through 1993.

First releases 
The first release on Southern Records was Babes in Toyland's album Fontanelle, in August 1992.

2000s 
Label founder Loder died in 2005. In the same year Allison Schnackenberg, label boss, set up the Latitudes imprint to record and release one sessions, in a similar spirit to the BBC's  Peel Sessions.

Starting in late 2008, Southern closed its international office and moved all operations to London. Chicago closed November 2008, Le Havre closed July 2009, and Berlin closed December 2012.

Imprints
Other label imprints operated by Southern include Black Diamond, Latitudes and Truth Cult.

Roster

90 Day Men
Antisect
Action Beat
Asva
Atombombpocketknife
Babes in Toyland
Bellafea
Bell Gardens
Billy Mahonie
Bob Tilton
Boduf Songs
Cat On Form
Chrome Hoof
Chumbawamba
Crucifix
Darediablo
Dianogah
Geoff Farina
Frightwig
Faucet
Glorytellers
Hawnay Troof
Him
Jenny Hoyston
Joan of Arc
Karate
The Lapse
Les Savy Fav
Lungleg
Mothlite
NoMeansNo
The Owl Service
The Paper Chase
P.W. Long
Racebannon
Rex
Therapy?
The Sorts
Slow Loris
 The Smoothies
Sweep the Leg Johnny
Tartufi
Ten Grand
Todd
Trencher
Ui
William Elliott Whitmore

Southern imprints

Black Diamond
Hella
Goon Moon
P.W. Long
Oxbow
Unsane

Latitudes

Truth Cult
Action Beat
Pornbow
Japanther

See also
 Southern Studios
 List of independent UK record labels
 List of record labels

References

External links
 Official site 

American independent record labels
British independent record labels